Allen Chapel may refer to:
 Allen Chapel, Texas, a community in Houston County
 Allen Chapel African Methodist Episcopal Church (disambiguation), one of several churches